The Speed Spook is a 1924 American silent comedy film directed by Charles Hines and starring Johnny Hines, Faire Binney and Edmund Breese.

Cast
 Johnny Hines as 'Blue Streak' Billings
 Faire Binney as Betty West
 Edmund Breese as Chuck Brady
 Warner Richmond as Jud Skerrit
 Frank Losee as Sheriff West
 Henry West as Hiram Smith

References

Bibliography
 Munden, Kenneth White. The American Film Institute Catalog of Motion Pictures Produced in the United States, Part 1. University of California Press, 1997.

External links
 

1924 films
1924 comedy films
1920s English-language films
American silent feature films
American auto racing films
Silent American comedy films
Films directed by Charles Hines
1920s American films